Rhodopseudomonas is a genus of bacteria from the family Nitrobacteraceae.

Phylogeny
The currently accepted taxonomy is based on the List of Prokaryotic names with Standing in Nomenclature (LPSN). The phylogeny is based on whole-genome analysis.

References 

Nitrobacteraceae
Bacteria genera